miss M. is the 13th studio album by Japanese singer-songwriter Miyuki Nakajima, released in November 1985.

Track listing
All songs written and composed by Miyuki Nakajima.

Side one
All songs arranged by Tsugutoshi Gotō (except "Netsubyou" arranged by Chito Kawauchi)
"" – 3:15
"" – 3:39
"" – 3:00
"" – 5:35
"" [Album mix] – 5:49

Side two
All songs arranged by Tsugutoshi Gotō (except "Tsuki no Akanbou" and "Kata ni Furu Ame" arranged by Nobuo Kurata, "Wasurete wa Ikenai" arranged by Chito Kawauchi)
"" – 4:13
"" – 5:03
"" – 4:05
"" – 4:44
"" – 5:31

Chart positions

References

1985 albums
Miyuki Nakajima albums
Pony Canyon albums